Dorogobuzhsky District  is an administrative and municipal district (raion), one of the twenty-five in Smolensk Oblast, Russia. It is located in the center of the oblast. Its administrative center is the town of Dorogobuzh. Population: 29,077 (2010 Census);  The population of Dorogobuzh accounts for 36.9% of the district's total population.

Sights
The 18th-century estate of Aleksino used to be reputed for its stud-farm of Orlov stallions. The Boldin Monastery, dating from the 15th century, was renovated by the Godunov family in the late 16th century. The Godunovs commissioned a five-domed cathedral, a tented refectory, and a pillar-like bell-tower to be built there. According to Pyotr Baranovsky, the abbey represented the best-preserved 16th-century monastery complex in Eastern Europe. It was blown up by the retreating Germans in 1943 but was partly rebuilt in the 1990s.

References

Notes

Sources

Districts of Smolensk Oblast
